Margaret Elisabeth of Leiningen-Westerburg (30 June 1604 in Schadeck, today part of Runkel – 13 August 1667 at Wiesenburg Castle), was a Countess of Leiningen and regent of the Landgraviate of Hesse-Homburg during the minority of her sons from 1638.

Life 
Margaret Elizabeth was the only child from the first marriage of Count Christopher of Leiningen-Westerburg (1575-1635) and Anna Maria Ungnad, Baroness of Weissenwolff (1573-1606). She married on 10 August 1622 at Butzbach to Landgrave Frederick I of Hesse-Homburg.  After Margaret Elizabeth had given birth to her second son, primogeniture was introduced in the landgraviate.

After the death of her husband on 9 May 1638, she led the regency for her infant sons.  Her youngest son was Frederick II of Hesse-Homburg, the famous Prince of Homburg.

Issue 
Margaret Elisabeth and Frederick I had the following children:
 Louis Philippe (1623–1643)
 George  (1624–1624)
 William Christoph (1625–1681), Landgrave of Hesse-Homburg
 married firstly in 1650 Princess Sophia Eleonore of Hesse-Darmstadt (1634–1663)
 married secondly in 1665 Princess Anna Elisabeth of Saxe-Lauenburg (1624–1688)
 George Christian (1626–1677)
 married in 1666 Anna Catherine of Pogwisch, widow of von Ahlefeldt (1633–1694)
 Anna Margaret (1629–1686)
 married in 1650 Duke  Philip Louis of Schleswig-Holstein-Sonderburg-Wiesenburg (1620–1689)
 Frederick II (1633–1708), Landgrave of Hesse-Homburg, better known as The Prince of Homburg
 married firstly in 1661 Countess Margareta Brahe, widow of Oxenstierna (1603–1669)
 married secondly in 1670 Princess Louise Elisabeth of Courland (1646–1690)
 married thirdly in 1691 Countess Sophia Sibylle of Leiningen-Westerburg, widow of the Count of Leiningen-Dagsburg (1656–1724)

References 
Barbara Dölemeyer: Fontane, Kleist und Hölderlin p. 12 
Claudia Tietz: Johann Winckler (1642-1705) p. 69

Regents of Germany
Leiningen family
House of Hesse-Homburg
1604 births
1667 deaths
17th-century German people
17th-century women rulers